Kapkiam is a settlement in Baringo County, Kenya.

References 

Populated places in Baringo County